Peter Paul Althaus (28 July 1892, Münster – 16 September 1965, Munich) was a German poet.

References

 

1892 births
1965 deaths
Writers from Munich
German male poets
German-language poets
20th-century German poets
20th-century German male writers